Shantipur or Santipur is a city and a municipality in Nadia district in the Indian state of West Bengal.

These place names may also refer to:

India
Santipur (Vidhan Sabha constituency), the assembly constituency of Shantipur, West Bengal
Santipur (community development block), an administrative division in Ranaghat subdivision of Nadia district in West Bengal
Santipur, Guwahati, a locality in Guwahati near the south bank of the river Brahmaputra
Shantipur, Purba Medinipur, a census town in Sahid Matangini CD Block, Purba Medinipur district, West Bengal

Nepal
Shantipur, Janakpur
Shantipur, Lumbini
Shantipur, Mechi